Frank Crenshaw Millspaugh (January 14, 1872 – July 8, 1947) was a United States Representative from Missouri.

Born in Shawneetown, Illinois, Millspaugh attended public schools. He entered the grain commission business in New Orleans, Louisiana, in 1891. He moved to Chicago in 1892, to St. Louis, Missouri, in 1894 and to Canton, Missouri, in 1896 and continued the grain shipping business. He engaged in banking 1900-1921. He served as delegate to the Republican State convention in 1912. He served as mayor of Canton, Missouri from 1915 to 1919.

Millspaugh was elected as a Republican to the Sixty-seventh Congress; he was an unsuccessful candidate in 1922 for reelection to the Sixty-eighth Congress and resigned, having served March 4, 1921 until December 5, 1922.
He was the State commissioner of finance in 1923 and 1924.

He moved to Jefferson City, Missouri, in 1925 and engaged in the real estate business until 1929, when he entered the brokerage business. Millspaugh was elected county judge of Jasper County, Missouri, in 1942 and was reelected in 1944 and 1946; he served until his death in Joplin, Missouri, July 8, 1947 at the age of 75 and was interred in Forest Grove Cemetery, Canton, Missouri.

References

1872 births
1947 deaths
Republican Party members of the United States House of Representatives from Missouri
People from Lewis County, Missouri
Mayors of places in Missouri
People from Shawneetown, Illinois
People from Canton, Missouri